HMS Excellent is a Royal Navy "stone frigate" (shore establishment) sited on Whale Island near Portsmouth in Hampshire. HMS Excellent is itself part of the Maritime Warfare School, with a headquarters at HMS Collingwood, although a number of lodger units are resident within the site, the principal of which is the headquarters of  Fleet Commander (Navy Command Headquarters).

History

RN Gunnery School afloat
In the 1829 a Commander George Smith advocated the establishment of a Naval School of Gunnery; accordingly, the following year, the third-rate HMS Excellent was converted into a training ship and moored just north of Portsmouth Dockyard, opposite Fareham Creek. Smith was given oversight and set up Excellent not only as a training establishment but also as a platform for experimental firing of new weapons (the creek was used as a firing range). In 1832 Smith was replaced in command by Captain Thomas Hastings, under whom the school grew both numerically and in reputation, as trained gunners began to prove their effectiveness in combat situations. In 1834 the original Excellent was replaced by the second rate HMS Boyne which was duly renamed Excellent.

In 1845 Captain Henry Ducie Chads took over command of Excellent in succession to Hastings. He remained in post until 1854, by which time the Admiralty had purchased 'Whaley Island' (which at the time was little more than a sandbank). Chads was succeeded first by Captain Thomas Maitland and then, in 1857, by Richard Hewlett.  In December 1859 the first-rate Queen Charlotte took over the role of gunnery training ship and was likewise renamed Excellent.

In 1863 Hewlett was replaced by Captain Astley Cooper Key, who was in turn succeeded by Captain Arthur Hood some three years later. By this time, a rifle range had been established on the island for the use of HMS Excellent and the first building appeared there, the land having been somewhat drained and levelled. Under Hood's leadership a torpedo section was set up within the school; overseen by Commander Jacky Fisher (who would later return to Excellent as commanding officer), this was made a separate establishment, as HMS Vernon, in 1876.

RN Gunnery School ashore
It was under Fisher's command, in the 1880s, that approval was given to move the gunnery school ashore, on to Whale Island. The initial proposal had come from a Lieutenant Percy Scott, who (having arrived to train as a gunnery lieutenant in 1878) initially used the island as a running track. The island had grown significantly in size since the 1850s: indeed, up until the early 1890s excavated spoil from the expansion of the Dockyard was routinely conveyed there, using convict labour, to build the island up. Scott returned to Excellent as an instructor in 1883 and took the opportunity to submit a detailed proposal to Fisher which was accepted. (Later in his career Scott was again posted to HMS Excellent on two occasions, returning first as Commander in 1890 and then as Captain of the establishment in the early 1900s.)

The first buildings of the shore establishment were begun in 1885 (including what is now known as the Quarterdeck Block) and building work then continued alongside the tasks of draining and levelling the land (the site was known colloquially as 'Mud Island'). By 1891 the whole operation had moved ashore and the old ship was paid off. Centred on a large open drill ground, the site includes the officers' mess in a range to the north with rows of barracks blocks for ratings (demolished and rebuilt c. 2010) arrayed behind. To the west, opposite the Quarterdeck, were long gun battery sheds; the long low drill shed to the south is a listed building (1892). Firing training took place on the batteries and all different varieties of guns were kept on site for instruction on their maintenance and operation. The Anti-Aircraft Experimental Section of the Munitions Inventions Department was based here from September 1916, under Archibald Hill. Later, full-sized dummy gun turrets were provided for training purposes. Seagoing training also took place up until 1957 on a series of battleships, cruisers and destroyers that were attached to the facility. From the late 1950s guided missile training was also provided.The Portsmouth Field Gun Crew, competing in the Royal Navy field gun competition at the Royal Tournament, used to be based at the site. A small museum in the Quarterdeck block preserves artefacts from Excellent's days as a gunnery school; among them is the Royal Navy State Funeral Gun Carriage which is drawn by naval ratings at state funerals of monarchs and other distinguished UK citizens.

Decommissioning and recommissioning

The gunnery school closed in 1985 whereupon HMS Excellent was decommissioned. The site then became part of HMS Nelson.

The establishment was recommissioned as HMS Excellent in 1994 following the closure of the old HMS Phoenix in nearby Tipner and Horsea Island, and the relocation of the school of Fire Fighting and Damage Control from there to Whale Island.

Captains of HMS Excellent 
The following list goes as far as 1984.  It shows the date of appointment, and rank and decorations held at the time.  In some cases a captain held several sequential appointments.  It does not show captains held on the books of the Excellent who were not commanding officers of Excellent.

Elements within the site

Maritime Warfare School elements within the site are:
 MWS Phoenix school of Nuclear, Biological and Chemical Defence, damage control and fire fighting HMS Phoenix
 South East Naval Military Training Centre
 Defence Diving School Boat Section

HMS Excellent also provides administrative and infrastructure support to the Maritime Warfare School elements at Defence Diving School, Horsea Island, and small arms ranges at Tipner.

Lodger units
Lodger units are:
 Navy Command Headquarters – Fleet Commander
 Headquarters of UK Maritime Battle Staff
 Fleet Regional Photographic Unit (South East Region)
 DASA (Navy Branch): Defence Analytical Services and Advice is a Division of the MOD tasked with providing statistical and analytical support to the Navy Statistical Publications produced by DASA Navy

Cadets
HMS Excellent is home to a number of Royal Navy cadet units:
 Volunteer Cadet Corps
 Portsmouth Division Royal Marines Volunteer Cadet Corps
 HMS Excellent Royal Naval Volunteer Cadet Corps
 TS Alamein Sea Cadet Corps
Sea Cadet Corps National Training Centre

Notes

References

Sources

External links
 Portsmouth Action Field Gun – Photos and Video
 Volunteer Cadet Corps

Royal Navy bases in Hampshire
Royal Navy shore establishments
Organisations based in Portsmouth